Půlnoc (pronounced "pool-knots" and Czech for "midnight") was a Czech rock band established in 1988 by three members of the Plastic People of the Universe: Milan Hlavsa (bass guitar), Josef Janíček (keyboards), and Jiří Kabeš (violin and guitar). Hlavsa chose his sister-in-law, Michaela Němcová, to be the band's lead singer. Hlavsa started Pulnoc because the Plastic People was denied permission to travel or perform openly by the Czech government. In the spring of 1989, Pulnoc went on a tour of the United States that led to them gaining considerable favorable attention there. For example, Robert Christgau named a bootleg of a concert the band played in New York City the best album of 1989. Steve Hochman described this tour as "remarkable at least as much musically as it was culturally," writing that when the band played a show in San Francisco in 1989, "Plastic People fans and the uninitiated curious alike were floored by the combination of heavy metal, art-rock, operatic vocals and locomotive-worthy propulsion."

In 2011, the band reunited (without Hlavsa and Kabeš) and played a number of concerts during the following decade. In April and May 2022, they embarked on an eight-date final tour, culminating on 13 May 2022 in Jihlava.

Discography
Pulnoc (Globus International, 1990)
City of Hysteria (Arista Records, 1991)

References

External links
AllMusic Biography
Review by Greg Kot in the Chicago Tribune
Reviews of Pulnoc's albums by Robert Christgau
http://www.tomhull.com/ocston/guests/jy/jy-ppu.php

1988 establishments in Czechoslovakia
Musical groups established in 1988
Czechoslovak rock music groups
Arista Records artists